Anne Solway Hegerty (born 14 July 1958) is an English quizzer and television personality. Since 2010, she has been a "chaser" on the ITV game show The Chase as "The Governess", and was a contestant on the 2018 series of the ITV reality show I'm a Celebrity...Get Me Out of Here!

Early life
Anne Solway Hegerty was born in the Westminster area of London on 14 July 1958. She studied journalism at the University of Edinburgh. She started her journalistic career in the 1980s as a reporter and feature writer at the South Wales Argus in Newport, before moving to Manchester. She also worked as a ghostwriter and wrote two books for American children's author Richard Scarry, but she said that the books "were a bit rubbish and nobody bought them".

Career
Hegerty is one of the chasers on the ITV game show The Chase, alongside Mark Labbett, Shaun Wallace, Paul Sinha, Jenny Ryan and Darragh Ennis. As well as being in the UK version, she is also a chaser on the Australian version of the show on the Seven Network with fellow UK chaser Labbett.

Hegerty has made appearances on a number of other quiz shows, including Mastermind, Fifteen to One, Today's the Day, Are You an Egghead? and Brain of Britain.  she was ranked 55th (and second among women) in the World Quizzing Championships. In November 2013 she competed in the Bolton Premier Quiz League to become Brain of Bolton for the second time. She also competes in the Online Quiz League for team Pericardium, placing 26th individually as of January 2023. 

Hegerty was the "Phone A Friend" for a competitor, Lisa Harman from Ecclesfield, on Who Wants to be A Millionaire in 2010; Harman won £75,000. Hegerty correctly answered the question about the author of Twilight, Stephenie Meyer.

In December 2014, Hegerty appeared in the pantomime Cinderella as the Wicked Stepmother at the Grange Theatre in Northwich. In December 2015, she appeared as Fleshcreep in the pantomime Jack and the Beanstalk at the Civic Hall, Ellesmere Port, which was also booked for performance at Heywood and Radcliffe. At Easter 2016, Hegerty appeared as the Enchantress in the pantomime Beauty and the Beast, alongside Keith Chegwin and Basil Brush, at the Palace Theatre, Redditch, which sold out, and other venues. 

From 6 December 2016 until 1 January 2017, she appeared as Blackweed in the pantomime Jack and the Beanstalk at the Kings Theatre, Southsea, Portsmouth. From 8 to 31 December 2017, she appeared as The Empress of China in the pantomime Aladdin at the Princess Theatre (Torquay). From 18 December 2018 until 6 January 2019, she appeared as Queen Rat in the pantomime Dick Whittington at the Theatre Royal (Windsor); Anita Harris played the role until Hegerty returned from I'm a Celebrity ... Get Me Out of Here. From 5 December 2019 to 5 January 2020, she appeared as Carabosse in the pantomime Sleeping Beauty at Middlesbrough Theatre.

On 19 October 2017, Hegerty appeared alongside fellow Chaser Mark Labbett on an episode of Celebrity Juice. She also guested on an edition of BBC Radio 4's I'm Sorry I Haven't a Clue, which was broadcast in December 2017. 

Since January 2018, Hegerty has presented Britain's Brightest Family on ITV.
Hegerty came in 75th place in the World Quizzing Championship of 2018, and 122nd in 2019.

In November 2018, Hegerty participated in series 18 of I'm a Celebrity...Get Me Out of Here!, where she finished in seventh place.

Outside of television, she appeared in a special video on YouTube with her whispering fan fiction for an ASMR video.

Charity work

In 2018, she joined 26 other celebrities at Metropolis Studios to record an original Christmas song called "Rock With Rudolph", written and produced by Grahame and Jack Corbyn.  The song was in aid of Great Ormond Street Hospital. It was released digitally through independent record label Saga Entertainment in November 2018 under the artist name the Celebs. The music video debuted exclusively with The Sun on 29 November 2018 and had its first TV showing on Good Morning Britain on 30 November 2018.

In 2020, amid the COVID-19 pandemic, Hegerty rejoined the Celebs, which now included Frank Bruno and X Factor winner Sam Bailey, to raise money for the Alzheimer's Society and Action for Children. They recorded a new rendition of "Merry Christmas Everyone" by Shakin' Stevens and it was released digitally on 11 December 2020 by Saga Entertainment. The music video debuted on Good Morning Britain the day before the song's release.

In 2021, Hegerty rejoined the Celebs to record a cover of the Beatles classic "Let It Be", a song produced by Grahame and Jack Corbyn assisted by Stephen Large. The song was recorded at Metropolis Studios, in support of Mind, and released on 3 December 2021 by Saga Entertainment. Hegerty was part of a choir of celebrities including Georgia Hirst, Ivan Kaye and Eunice Olumide who were backing EastEnders star Shona McGarty.

Personal life
Hegerty lives in Manchester. She has Asperger syndrome, which was not diagnosed until 2003 when she was 45. 

In 2022 she featured on the ITV programme DNA Journey, when it was revealed that she is of Scottish descent, and is both a descendant of Robert the Bruce and a distant relative of Elizabeth II.

Hegerty is a practising Catholic.

TV appearances

See also
 List of I'm a Celebrity...Get Me Out of Here! (British TV series) contestants

References

External links

1958 births
Living people
Quiz championship players
Contestants on British game shows
English television personalities
English Roman Catholics
Writers from London
People from Manchester
People from the City of Westminster
People with Asperger syndrome
People from Wood Green
I'm a Celebrity...Get Me Out of Here! (British TV series) participants